Queen's Barracks was a military installation in Perth, Scotland.

History
The barracks were established in the north west of the city as a home for cavalry regiments in 1793. It became the home to the 2nd Dragoon Guards (Queen's Bays) and it was from this regiment that the barracks derived its name. The barracks were subsequently converted to take infantry regiments.

In 1873 a system of recruiting areas based on counties was instituted under the Cardwell Reforms and the barracks became the depot for the 42nd (Royal Highland) Regiment of Foot and the 79th (Cameron Highlanders) Regiment of Foot. Following the Childers Reforms, the 42nd (Royal Highland) Regiment of Foot amalgamated with the 73rd (Perthshire) Regiment of Foot to form the Black Watch with its depot in the barracks in 1881.

The barracks were decommissioned in May 1961 and were then demolished and the site became used for the headquarters of Perth and Kinross Constabulary, then Tayside Police and, today, Police Scotland.

In the 1960s the Regimental Headquarters and the Regimental Museum moved to Balhousie Castle where the Museum still remains. The Army Reserve Centre, located further up the Dunkeld Road where HQ Company 51st Highland Volunteers are now based, has since adopted the name of Queen's Barracks.

In June 2017 the Black Watch Association unveiled a memorial in the form of a simple stone structure on the site of the former barracks.

References

Installations of the British Army
Barracks in Scotland
Buildings and structures in Perth, Scotland
1793 establishments in Great Britain
1961 disestablishments in the United Kingdom